The Gaue (Singular: Gau) were the main administrative divisions of Nazi Germany from 1934 to 1945.

The Gaue were formed in 1926 as Nazi Party regional districts in Weimar Germany based on the territorial changes after the First World War. The Gau system was established in 1934 as part of the Gleichschaltung process, replacing the de jure system of Länder (states) and Prussian provinces, which held no administrative purpose since the Enabling Act of 1933 and were reduced to rudimentary bodies. Each Gau was headed by an administrative leader, the Gauleiter, a high-ranking Nazi Party official with near-autocratic powers.

Germany consisted of 32 Gaue in 1934, eventually peaking at 42 Gaue with regions occupied in 1938 to early 1939 (Austria, Sudetenland, Memelland) and conquered during the Second World War incorporated into existing Gaue or organised as Reichsgaue, a special type of Gau where the Gauleiter also carried the position of Reichsstatthalter. The Gaue system was dissolved on May 8, 1945, following the surrender of Nazi Germany.

Etymology
Gau is an archaic Germanic term for a region within a country, often a former or actual province, and used in Medieval times as roughly corresponding to an English shire. The term was revived by the Nazi Party in 1920s as the name given to the regional associations of the party in Weimar Germany, based mainly along state and district lines.

Gaue, Reichsgaue and Länder 
The Gaue existed parallel to the German states, the Länder, and Prussian provinces throughout the Nazi period. Pro forma, the Administrative divisions of Weimar Germany were left in place. The plan to abolish the Länder was ultimately given up because Hitler shrank away from structural reforms, a so-called Reichsreform, fearing it would upset local party leaders. For the same reason, the borders of the Gaue remained unchanged within Germany throughout this time. The Gaue were only enlarged through the adding of occupied territories after 1938. While the Länder continued to exist, the real power on local level did lie with the Gauleiters, not the Minister Presidents of the German states. The Gauleiters were directly appointed by Hitler and only answerable to him. In practice, interference from above was rare and their power almost absolute.

Gaue established in 1934

Reichsgaue established in the 1930s 

New Reichsgaue were established after the Anschluss of Austria and the incorporation of Sudetenland following the Munich Agreement. Southern parts of Czechoslovakia also gained by the Munich Agreement were not made part of Reichsgau Sudetenland, but incorporated into the northern Reichsgaue of former Austria.

Reichsgaue established during the Second World War 

Of the territories annexed from Poland and the Free City of Danzig in 1939, Reichsgau Wartheland and Reichsgau Danzig-West Prussia were created. Annexed territories of pre-war Poland not within these two Reichsgaue were incorporated into the neighboring Gaue East Prussia and Silesia. The Grand Duchy of Luxembourg as well as Alsace-Lorraine, annexed from pre-war France in 1940, were attached to the bordering Southwestern Gaue of Nazi Germany.

Auslandsgau 
There was also an extraterritorial Gau named Auslandsorganisation for party members overseas. Its headquarters were in Berlin. This Auslandsgau was considered to be the 43rd Gau of Nazi Germany.

Operational Zones

After the overthrow of Benito Mussolini, the Italian government secretly began negotiations with the Allies about Italy switching sides to the Allied camp. In retaliation the Germans occupied large parts of Italy, freed Mussolini, and re-installed him as the puppet ruler of a new fascist state in those parts that were occupied by the German Army. While officially in control over all the areas held by erstwhile Fascist Italy, large parts in the northeast located between Switzerland and the Adriatic were re-organized as Operational Zones (Operationszonen). These were informally annexed by Germany, and attached to adjacent Gaue of the Reich. There were two such Operational Zones:

In a supplementary OKW order dated 10 September 1943, Hitler decrees on the establishment of further Operational Zones in Northern Italy, which were the stretch all the way to the French border. Unlike Alpenvorland and Küstenland, these zones did not immediately receive high commissioners (oberster kommissar) as civilian advisors, but were military regions where the commander was to exercise power on behalf of Army Group B. Operation zone Nordwest-Alpen (Northwest Alps) or Schweizer Grenze (Swiss Frontier) was located between the Stelvio Pass and Monte Rosa and was to contain wholly the Italian provinces of Sondrio and Como and parts of the provinces of Brescia, Varese, Novara and Vercelli. The zone of Französische Grenze (French Frontier) was to encompass areas west of Monte Rosa and was to incorporate the province of Aosta and a part of the province of Turin, and presumably also the provinces of Cuneo and Imperia.

General Government

On 12 October 1939, Hitler signed a decree declaring that the Polish territories occupied by the Germans would be taken over by the Governor of the occupied Polish territories, which finally came into effect on 26 October.

On 22 July 1941, following the German invasion of the Soviet Union and the occupation of Eastern Galicia, Hitler signed a decree declaring the region to be taken over by the Governor of Poland from noon on 1 August.

While theoretically outside the boundaries of the Reich proper, it was considered part of Greater Germany by Nazi officials as an "autonomous" region (i.e. not directly subordinated to the Berlin government).

It was in turn sub-divided into four Distrikte (districts). 
Distrikt Krakau;
Distrikt Warschau;
Distrikt Lublin;
Distrikt Radom.

After the invasion of the Soviet Union in 1941, a fifth district was added, created out of former territories of Austrian Galicia:
Distrikt Galizien.

Protectorate of Bohemia and Moravia

On 16 March 1939, Hitler signed a decree declaring the German-occupied territories of Czechoslovakia (the occupied area included Bohemia and Moravia) to be incorporated into Germany and protected by Germany as the Protectorate of Bohemia and Moravia.

Two separate structures for its territorial administration existed within the protectorate. The Protectorate was officially divided into two Länder (lands): Bohemia and Moravia, which were in turn sub-divided into a number of smaller units. The Nazi party implemented a completely different form of organization by setting up four separate party districts in the area, and subordinating these organizationally to the surrounding Gaue and Reichsgaue: Sudetenland, Bayreuth (Bayerische Ostmark), Lower Danube, and Upper Danube. These two methods continued to co-exist in the protectorate for the entire duration of its existence.

Planned future districts
The Nazi government openly pursued and practiced aggressive territorial expansionism, intending to further extend the already greatly increased territorial base of the German state. In anticipation of these expected future territorial enlargements, potential new districts were theorized upon at length by Nazi ideologists, government officials, and territorial planning departments. These expansions were intended to take place in two distinct ways:

Territorial expansion into Eastern Europe

In order to expand the Lebensraum of the German people the Slavic populations of Eastern Europe were intended to be wiped out through a combined process of extermination, expulsion, starvation, and enslavement that would effectively Germanize these territories in the long run. Nazi racial offices planned that the colonization with Germanic peoples of these conquered eastern territories was to proceed most intensively in the three so-called Siedlungsmarken (Settlement marches) or Reichsmarken of Ingermannland (Ingria), the Memel-Narew area, and the Southern Ukraine and the Crimean peninsula. The latter of these was intended to be newly re-organized as a Gotengau (Gau of the Goths), in honor of the Crimean Goths who had at one point dwelled there. Of the Baltic countries, Peipusland was proposed as a replacement-name for Estonia, and Dünaland for Latvia.

In a conference on July 16, 1941, discussing the future organization of the conquered Soviet territories Hitler stated his intention to turn not only the above-mentioned areas, but also the entire Baltic region (Reichskommissariat Ostland), the Volga German colony, and the Baku district into future Reichsgebieten (Reich territories). On 3 November 1941 he also elaborated on the toponymic aspect of Germanizing the east:

The central and upper Vistula valley within the General Government were variously discussed as having to become either a single Vandalengau (Gau of the Vandals) or 3-5 other new Reichsgaue. An earlier proposal from 1939 also advocated for the creation of a Reichsgau Beskidenland, which was to stretch from the area to the west of Cracow to the San river in the east. In Axis-occupied Yugoslavia, Sepp Janko, Nazi representative of Danube Swabian interests, pushed for the establishment of a Reichsgau Banat or Prinz-Eugen-Gau, which would have encompassed the Yugoslavian territories of Bačka, Banat, parts of Transylvania (Siebenbürgen) and Baranya.

Annexation of the Germanic countries

The Nazi racial categorization of the ethnic groups of Europe classified the Northern Europeans, especially those closely related to the Germans (itself considered to be a single nationality of which Swiss and Austrians were nothing but sub-regional identities at best) such as the Dutch, the Flemings, the Danish, Norwegians, Swedish, and English as part of a superior Aryan-Nordic master race (Herrenrasse). Following the integration of Austria into a Greater Germany (Großdeutschland), Hitler decided that he would follow the same policy in the future for all other countries that he regarded by virtue of their perceived racial qualifications as "belonging" to the Reich. This meant that the Low Countries, at least the German-speaking parts of Switzerland, Liechtenstein and the Scandinavian states were eventually to be annexed into a much larger Greater Germanic Reich (Großgermanisches Reich) by being broken up into smaller state and party administrative units, such as Denmark into a Gau Nordmark, and the Netherlands into a Gau Westland.

Afterwards the very notion of these countries ever having been independent or separate from the rest of the Reich was to be suppressed indefinitely. The objective called for the inauguration of a new period of rapidly enforced Gleichschaltung, the end result of which would be that aside from their local "language dialects" these countries were to become perfect duplicates of National Socialist Germany in all political and social respects.

In addition it was intended to revert the western borders of Germany with France to those of the late-medieval Holy Roman Empire. A strip of eastern France from the mouth of the Somme to Lake Geneva (the so-called "closed" or "forbidden" zone of German occupied France) was prepared to be annexed to the German Reich as Reichsgau Burgund, with Nancy (Nanzig) as the capital.

See also 
 Administrative divisions of Germany
 Administrative divisions of the German Democratic Republic
 Areas annexed by Nazi Germany
 Gausturm
 List of Gauleiters
 States of the German Empire

References

Sources 
 Der große Atlas der Weltgeschichte (in German), Historical map book, published: 1990, publisher: Orbis Verlag, Munich,

External links 
 Shoa.de - List of Gaue and Gauleiter